15 Storeys High is a  British sitcom, set in a tower block. It originated as two radio series broadcast in 1998–2000, transferring to television in 2002–2004. The main characters in the television series are Vince Clark, a depressed, sardonic recluse played by Sean Lock, and Errol Spears, Vince's optimistic whipping boy, played by Benedict Wong.

Radio series
Both radio series (Sean Lock's 15 Minutes of Misery and Sean Lock: 15 Storeys High) were recorded in front of a studio audience. The theme tune used for both series is the 1960s song "England Swings" by Roger Miller.

Sean Lock's 15 Minutes of Misery
The show's original incarnation was a radio series entitled Sean Lock's 15 Minutes of Misery. It was broadcast weekly on BBC Radio 4 in the "Late Night on 4" comedy slot at 11.00pm. It ran for six episodes between 30 December 1998 and 3 February 1999. The show was written by Sean Lock and produced by Dan Freedman, and starred Lock, Kevin Eldon and Hattie Hayridge.

Sean Lock: 15 Storeys High (Radio 4)
Lock's second series was entitled Sean Lock: 15 Storeys High, and it was also broadcast on Radio 4's "Late Night on 4" comedy slot and written by Sean Lock and Martin Trenaman and produced by Chris Neill. These series each consisted of five half-hour episodes. Series one aired from 24 November 1999 to 22 December 1999, and starred Lock, along with Felix Dexter, Jenny Eclair, Tim Mitchell, Tracy-Ann Oberman, Chris Pavlo and Peter Serafinowicz. Series two aired from 24 November 2000 to 22 December 2000, and included roles from Dan Freedman, Alex Lowe, Dan Mersh, Paul Putner, Rob Rouse and Chris Neill. The 15 Storeys High radio series used a different method to present the events going on in other flats in the tower block. It dispensed with the idea of Sean listening in on others using "Bugger King", replacing it with a voiceover simply announcing the flat number of the subsequent scene. The show introduced Sean's flatmate Errol (played by Serafinowicz in series 1, episodes 2–5).

TV programme
In 2002, 15 Storeys High was made into a television show which ran for two series, each series consisting of six half-hour episodes. In the television series, Lock's character was named Vince (he was simply Sean Lock in the radio series). Vince's flatmate Errol Spears was played by Benedict Wong. The TV shows were recorded on location and therefore without a live audience. The pilot originally had a laugh track, although this was removed for the broadcast.

The series was written by Lock, Trenaman and Mark Lamarr (credited under his real name, Mark Jones), and directed by Mark Nunneley. In the second TV series Lamarr is also credited as a writer. Digital comedy channel Gold began showing repeats of the first series during September 2014 as part of their After Dark comedy line-up schedules. In August 2021, following Lock's death, the series became available on BBC iPlayer.

Episodes

Series 1 (2002)

Series 2 (2004)

Filming locations
The flat in which Vince lives was actually filmed in a studio with large pictures of the adjacent tower blocks as a backdrop. All other flats in both series are real, and are located in the Brandon Estate, Kennington, London. The British science fiction drama Doctor Who has also used this location.
The location of the swimming pool, in which Vince works as a lifeguard, is Ladywell Leisure Centre in Lewisham, South East London, in the first series. In the second series, the swimming pool used is in the basement of the Shell Centre next to Waterloo station. The Elephant and Castle Shopping Centre is also used as a location in several episodes, notably the Sundial restaurant and the bowling alley.

Series one was initially broadcast on BBC Choice (the forerunner to BBC Three) from 7 November 2002 to 12 December 2002. Series two was broadcast from 12 February 2004 to 18 March 2004.

The show starred Sean Lock and Benedict Wong. Additional cast members included Dan Mersh, Bill Bailey, Aml Ameen, William Tomlin, Steven Webb, Mark Lamarr, Toby Jones, Tracey-Ann Oberman, Felix Dexter, Paul Putner, Pearce Quigley, Perry Benson, Simon Godley, Melanie Gutteridge, Peter Serafinowicz, Michael Greene and James Bachman.

Awards
In 2003, 15 Storeys High was nominated for a BAFTA in the Best New Director category for its unique style, and innovative shots.

References

External links
 Comedy Guide

BBC television sitcoms
BBC Radio comedy programmes
1999 radio programme debuts
2000 radio programme endings
2002 British television series debuts
2004 British television series endings
2000s British sitcoms
English-language television shows
Television shows set in London